Luphephe Dam is an arch type dam located on the Luphephe River, a tributary of the Nwanedi River, part of the Limpopo River basin. It was established in 1964 and it serves mainly for irrigation purposes. The hazard potential of the dam has been ranked high (3).

See also
List of reservoirs and dams in South Africa
List of rivers of South Africa

References 

 List of South African Dams from the Department of Water Affairs and Forestry (South Africa)

Dams in South Africa
Dams completed in 1963